Fayt-lez-Manage is a town of Wallonia and a district of the municipality of Manage, located in the province of Hainaut, Belgium.

The name dates to 1920, previously it was called Fayt-lez-Seneffe. It was a municipality in its own right before the merger of the municipalities in 1977.

The locality is served by bus 30 Anderlues - Morlanwelz - La Louvière - Strépy-Bracquenies - Thieu.

People

 (1896–1959), deputy, first president of the Belgian Socialist Party 
 (1901–1981), founder of the National League of Cooperators
Victor Harou (1851–1923), explorer in the Congo

Notes

Sources

Further reading

Former municipalities of Hainaut (province)